Marco M. Grifantini (born September 17, 1985) is an American professional baseball pitcher.

Grifantini attended Enterprise High School in Redding, California, and the University of California, Davis. He played for Cariparma Parma of the Italian Baseball League and the Italian national team in the 2013 World Baseball Classic. In the 2013 season, he plays for the Dunedin Blue Jays of the Class A-Advanced Florida State League.

Career Summary

Marco Grifantini's baseball career had a humble start playing prep ball at Enterprise High School (Redding, California). His skill at pitching saw better days after he joined Feather River College, Quincy, California and had to his belt a score of league awards. He, however, got his first international break after he switched to the University of California, Davis, California and was inducted into the college team to play in the College World Series preliminary rounds. That proved to be a turning point in his career. Playing at the packed-to-capacity Stanford University stadium was the most wonderful and unforgettable moment of his life.

Graduation over, Marco joined the Italian Baseball League. During his four-year stint in the Italian league, he was once able to win the titles of the Best Pitcher. During his career stay in Italy, he had the opportunity to represent the Italian National Baseball Team in international competitions played outside Italy.

Marco's latest entry this year was into the Italian team Cinderella that outplayed Mexico and Canada to advance to the second round of the World Baseball Classic. This victory by Cinderella triggered an offer for him from the Dunedin Blue Jays, the Class A-Advanced affiliate of the Toronto Blue Jays major league baseball club.

References

External links

1985 births
Living people
People from Yreka, California
2013 World Baseball Classic players
Baseball players from California
UC Davis Aggies baseball players
Dunedin Blue Jays players
Feather River Golden Eagles baseball players